Rodríguez v. Popular Democratic Party, 457 U.S. 1 (1982), was a case in which the Supreme Court of the United States heard on appeal from the Supreme Court of Puerto Rico whether Puerto Rico may by statute vest in a political party the power to fill an interim vacancy in the Puerto Rico Legislature. The Supreme Court of Puerto Rico held that such a procedure did not violate the United States Constitution, and the US Supreme Court upheld the decision of the Supreme Court of Puerto Rico. The case was of some interest to close followers of the Court as it featured the one and only return of former associate justice, Abe Fortas, now in private practice, at oral argument on behalf of the appellee.

Background 
A member of appellee Popular Democratic Party (hereafter "appellee") who was elected in the November, 1980, general election to the Puerto Rico House of Representatives from District 31, died in 1981. The Governor of Puerto Rico subsequently called for a "by-election" — open to all qualified voters in District 31 — to fill the vacancy. Appellee then filed suit in the Superior Court of Puerto Rico, alleging that the Puerto Rico statutes under which the Governor purported to act authorized only candidates and electors affiliated with appellee to participate in the by-election. Appellants, qualified electors in District 31 who are not affiliated with appellee, intervened as defendants. The court entered judgment for appellee. The Puerto Rico Supreme Court modified the Superior Court's judgment, holding, inter alia, that the pertinent statute, as properly construed, requires a by-election only if the party of the legislator vacating the seat fails to designate a replacement within 60 days after the vacancy occurs, and that, if the party selects a single candidate within such period, that candidate is declared "automatically elected to fill the vacancy." The court rejected appellants' contention that this procedure violated the Federal Constitution. While the case was pending before the Puerto Rico Supreme Court, appellee held a primary election in which only its members were permitted to participate, and which resulted in the selection of a person who, pursuant to the Supreme Court's mandate, was sworn in as the new representative from District 31.

See also
 Plyler v. Doe,

References

External links

United States Supreme Court cases
United States Supreme Court cases of the Burger Court
1982 in United States case law
Legal history of Puerto Rico
Popular Democratic Party (Puerto Rico)
1982 in Puerto Rico